Nigel Dennis Cook (born 10 May 1954) is a former English cricketer.  Cook was a right-handed batsman.  He was born in Swanton Morley, Norfolk.

Cook made his debut for Norfolk in the 1971 Minor Counties Championship against Buckinghamshire.  Cook played Minor counties cricket for Norfolk from 1971 to 1988, which included 66 Minor Counties Championship matches and 2 MCCA Knockout Trophy matches.  He made his List A debut against Leicestershire in the 1982 NatWest Trophy.  He made 2 further List A appearances, against Glamorgan in the 1983 NatWest Trophy and Leicestershire in the 1985 NatWest Trophy.  In his 3 List A matches, he scored 61 runs at an average of 30.50, with a high score of 31 not out.

References

External links
Nigel Cook at ESPNcricinfo
Nigel Cook at CricketArchive

1954 births
Living people
People from Swanton Morley
English cricketers
Norfolk cricketers
Sportspeople from Norfolk